The Ngarabal are an Aboriginal people of the area from Ashford, Tenterfield and Glen Innes in northern New South Wales, Australia.

Language
Ngarabal was still spoken in the area around Glen Innes, Stonehenge and Emmaville when John MacPherson practiced as a doctor in northern New South Wales in the late 1890s.

Country
The Ngarabal's territory covers an estimated  of land, from Tenterfield to Glen Innes. It includes the Beardy River and the Severn River catchment.

Society
The Ngarabal were closely related to the Jukambal, and it is possible that they may have constituted a western group of hordes of the latter, though authorities like A. Radcliffe-Brown have stated that they formed a distinct tribal unit.

Neither circumcision nor subincision were practiced by the Ngarabal. Nose piercing was equally unknown, as was tooth evulsion. Scarification however was practised for ornamental ends, among both men and women, but was optional.

Mythology
According to a Ngarabal, all indigenous people formed one unified group until the onset of a great flood which swept over the land, and the scant survivors were separated, each distinct remnant then developing into distinct tribes with different languages.

Medicine
A species of angophora apple tree, tapped for its tannin-rich kino, formed part of the Ngarabul pharmacopoeia. The gum of Eucalyptus robusta, yarra was also used medicinally. The leaves of the Manna Gum, horra, were used to treat ophthalmic maladies such as narrada mil (bad eye). In terms of internal medicine, their properties were used in cases of diarrhoea, something MacPherson observed as working when he applied the remedy to a pet opossum suffering from loose bowels. Two curative functions were thought to be derived from the fat of the carpet snakes, as an emollient for burns, and as an embrocation for rheumatism.

In the Ngarrabul tribe an eagle-hawk's feather was placed over the soft tissue of wounds, and this was in turn then covered with tea tree bark. Both were then bandaged up with a kangaroo skin to ensure a poultice-like warmth. Various species of Melaleuca, Callistemon and Leptospermum were stripped of bark to set bones: the bark was used inside-out, the bones were set or immobilized by the inner layers, the softer outside layers served as padding.

Snake-bites were treated by cutting the skin around the fanged flesh, and then several medicine men would suck the venom in turns. The "soldier bird" (bri-prri) was much prized for its habit of kicking up a din whenever snakes were nearby.

Recent activities
In 1987, the Glen Innes Aboriginal Land Council purchased The Willows in 1987 with the assistance of New South Wales Aboriginal Land Council. Marlow Hill is situated on "The Willows". Subsequently, 3 adjacent properties- Rosemont, Canoon and Boorabee, were added to the site as part of an indigenous protected area.

9 sites of Ngarabal cultural important have been identified in this area, now known as the Willows and Boorabee, which, since 2010, is classified under IUCN Category VI regulations and managed as a protected area where sustainable use of its natural resources is permitted. Ngarabal people may continue to harvest witchetty grubs, black orchids and mookrum berries.

Alternative names
 Marbul. (This name is believed to be either a result of mishearing the pronunciation, or a typographical mistake).
 Narbul
 Ngarrabul
 Ngoorabul

Notes

Citations

Sources

Aboriginal peoples of New South Wales
New England (New South Wales)